Glen Auldyn is a narrow valley about  long on the Isle of Man, with a river of the same name. This flows in a NNE direction and flows into the River Sulby not far from its estuary, near Ramsey. It is entirely within the parish of Lezayre. The lower one-third of the valley is inhabited and is partly followed by the B16 road. This section is overlooked by Sky Hill.

The middle section of the valley contains a ribbon of mature oak woodland.

The valley contains the small church of St Fingan.

References

Glen Auldyn
Glens of the Isle of Man